Yevheniy Heorhiyovych Morozko (born 15 February 1993) is a Ukrainian professional football midfielder who plays for Polissya Zhytomyr.

Career
Morozko is a product of the Kyiv's youth sportive schools. He began his career in the Ukrainian Premier League Reserves and Under 19 and amateur levels. Also spent one and a half seasons in the Ukrainian Second League with Sevastopol-2. 

In March 2015 he signed his next contract with another amateur side FC Kolos Kovalivka. Morozko was promoted with the team to the third and second tiers of the Ukrainian football and made his debut in the Ukrainian Premier League for Kolos on 30 July 2019, playing as the start squad player in a winning home match against FC Mariupol.

References

External links
 
 
 Profile at Footballfacts (in Russian)

1993 births
Living people
Footballers from Kyiv
Ukrainian footballers
Association football midfielders
FC Arsenal Kyiv players
FC Sevastopol-2 players
FC Dinaz Vyshhorod players
FC Kolos Kovalivka players
FC Polissya Zhytomyr players
Ukrainian Premier League players
Ukrainian First League players
Ukrainian Second League players